Megasporoporiella is a genus of five species of white rot poroid crust fungi in the family Polyporaceae. It was circumscribed in 2013 as a segregate genus of Megasporoporia. Characteristics of the genus include a dimitic hyphal structure, and skeletal hyphae that are weakly to moderately dextrinoid. Megasporoporiella has a primarily temperate distribution. The generic name refers to its similarity to Megasporoporia.

Species
Megasporoporiella cavernulosa (Berk.) B.K.Cui, Y.C.Dai & Hai J. Li (2013)
Megasporoporiella lacerata B.K.Cui & Hai J.Li (2013)
Megasporoporiella pseudocavernulosa B.K.Cui & Hai J.Li (2013)
Megasporoporiella rhododendri (Y.C.Dai & Y.L.Wei) B.K. Cui & Hai J.Li (2013)
Megasporoporiella subcavernulosa (Y.C.Dai & Sheng H.Wu) B.K. Cui & Hai J.Li (2013)

References

Polyporaceae
Polyporales genera
Fungi described in 2013
Taxa named by Yu-Cheng Dai
Taxa named by Bao-Kai Cui